John Ofori-Tenkorang is a Ghanaian public servant, an investment banker, an engineer and an academic. He is currently the Director General of Social Security and National Insurance Trust (SSNIT).

Early life and education
Ofori-Tenkorang had his secondary education at St. Peter's Boys Senior High School, Nkwatia Kwahu. He proceeded to Pearson College UWC in Victoria, British Columbia Canada. There, he obtained his International Baccalaureate Diploma. He enrolled at the Massachusetts Institute of Technology where he earned his bachelors, masters and doctorate degrees in electrical engineering and computer science.

Career
Ofori-Tenkorang begun his career as an instructor at the Massachusetts Institute of Technology. He developed propulsion systems and novel electric motors for electric vehicles for Ford Motor Company. He also worked for Quantum Corporation, Milpitas and Lutron Electronics Company in Coopersburg, Pennsylvania, Puerto Rico, and St. Kitts. He later joined the American International Group (AIG) where he worked with its financial subsidiary; AIG Trading Group. He became assistant vice president and later vice president of the group. He later joined AIG Financial Products Corporation (AIFP) and Banque AIG serving as its executive director. He was transferred to South Africa where he was responsible for the company's investment activities in Africa. In 2006, he left AIG to join Gödel Commodities Management, United States of America and Dubai Natural Resources World, United Arab Emirates.

He later returned to Ghana in 2016 to work at the office of the vice president as a technical adviser. He was appointed Director General of Social Security and National Insurance Trust (SSNIT) in 2017.

In 1991, Ofori-Tenkorang, David Otten and Leo Casey invented a "potentiometer state sensing circuit" in the US.

Personal life
Aside English, he is fluent in the French language. He is a member of the Tau Beta Pi society, Eta Kappa Nu society and Sigma XI Honour society.

Honours
Ofori-Tenkorang won the Carlton E. Tucker Teaching Award for Best Teacher at Massachusetts Institute of Technology.

See also
List of Akufo-Addo government ministers and political appointees
Social Security and National Insurance Trust

Selected works 
John Ofori-Tenkorang has a number of research publications and inventions to his credit.
Ofori-Tenkorang, J., Chapman, J., Lesieutre B.C., (1996). Transient and Stability Analysis of Time-Domain Reactive Current Analyzers using Averaged Waveforms; IEEE Transactions on Instrumentation and Measurement, Volume: 45, Issue: 1 , Feb 1996, pp. 280-287.
Ofori-Tenkorang, J., Lang, J.H., (1995). A Comparative Analysis Torque Production in Halbach and Conventional Surface-Mounted Permanent Magnet Synchronous Motors; IEEE-IAS Annual Meeting, Orlando, FL, U.S.A, pp. 657-663.
Ofori-Tenkorang, J., Lang, J.H., (1994) Halbach Permanent Magnet Motors: A Candidate for Direct Drive Wheel Motors; Universities Power Engineering Conference, Galway, Ireland, pp. 17-20.
Ofori-Tenkorang, J., (1993). A Microprocessor-Based Interactive Home Energy Monitor; S.M. Thesis, Massachusetts Institute of Technology, Cambridge, MA, USA.
Ofori-Tenkorang, K.M., (1993). Wireless Telecommunications with Microwave Digital Radio, African Technology Forum, New Age Telecommunications, Volume 6, No. 2.
Casey, L.F., Ofori-Tenkorang, J., Schlect, M.F., (1991). CMOS Drive and Control Circuitry for 1-10 MHz Power Conversion; IEEE Transactions on Power Electronics, Vol 6, Issue 4, 1991, pp. 749-758.
Ofori-Tenkorang, J., (1989). A Microprocessor-Controlled Household Power Monitoring Unit; S.B. Thesis, Massachusetts Institute of Technology, Cambridge, MA, USA.

References

Year of birth missing (living people)
Date of birth missing (living people)
Place of birth missing (living people)
Living people
MIT School of Engineering alumni
Ghanaian academics
Massachusetts Institute of Technology faculty
20th-century Ghanaian educators
St. Peter's Boys Senior High School alumni
People educated at a United World College